Ithaca Energy plc is a British oil and gas company operating in the North Sea. It is listed on the London Stock Exchange and is a constituent of the FTSE 250 Index.

History
The company was established in Canada in 2004 and moved to the UK when it took over operations in the Beatrice oil field in 2008.

In December 2010, Ithaca Energy became operator of the Anglia gas field by acquiring 30% stake in the field from GDF Suez E&P UK.

It traded on the Alternative Investment Market until it was acquired by an Israeli-based company, Delek Group, in 2017.

The company acquired Siccar Point Energy for $1.5 billion, giving it stakes in the Rosebank oil and gas field and the Cambo oil field, in July 2022.

The company was the subject of an initial public offering on the London Stock Exchange in November 2022.

Notes

Operations
The company has a 20% stake in the non-operating Rosebank oil and gas field and 70% stake in the operating Cambo oil field.

References

External links
 

Companies listed on the London Stock Exchange
Companies established in 2004